Mohamed Faisal is a Maldivian film actor, editor and director.

Career
Faisal made his film debut with the romantic film Loaiybahtakaa (2009), written and directed by Yoosuf Shafeeu in which he stars as businessman from a wealthy family struggling to express his feelings. The romantic drama, co-starring Sheela Najeeb, Fathimath Fareela and Yoosuf Shafeeu, tells the story of unrequited love, and proved to be a commercial success. His performance in the film garnered him a nomination at 1st Maldives Film Awards ceremony. This was followed by Ali Shifau-directed family drama Dhin Veynuge Hithaamaigaa (2010) which showcases discrimination against the islanders, family revenge and fatherhood responsibilities. The film was believed to be a "huge improvement" over the recent Maldivian films and was declared to be a commercial success. Faisal's only release of 2012 was Abdul Faththaah's romantic film Love Story alongside Ali Seezan, Amira Ismail and Aishath Rishmy. Displeased with the screenplay and performance of the actors, Nadheem of Haveeru wrote: "None of the actors were given scope to build their characters and none was able to justify their character. With excessive emotional scenes, actors were exposed to over-acting and nothing more". The last release of 2010 featured Manik in the drama film Heyonuvaane (2010) which was directed by Yoosuf Shafeeu and starring opposite Shafeeu, Sheela Najeeb and Fathimath Fareela. The story revolves around a male who is a victim of domestic abuse. Even though the film mainly received negative reviews from critics, it emerged as the second highest grossing Maldivian release of the year.

In 2013, Faisal featured in Ali Shifau-directed horror film Fathis Handhuvaruge Feshun 3D which serves as a prequel to Fathis Handhuvaru (1997) starring Reeko Moosa Manik and Niuma Mohamed in lead roles. It was based on a story by Ibrahim Waheed, Jinaa: Fathis Handhuvaruge Feshun (2009), which itself is a prequel to the story Fathishandhuvaru (1996) written by himself which was later adapted to a film by same name in 1997. The film was marketed as being the first 3D release for a Maldivian film and the first release derived from spin-off. Upon release the film received generally negative reviews from critics while his performance was considered to be "forgettable". Next, he collaborated with Hussain Munawwar for his second direction, the revenge thriller film Dhilakani (2013) alongside Ismail Rasheed, Mohamed Manik, Niuma Mohamed and Aminath Rishfa. The film deals with a man's tumultuous journey to seek vengeance and the demolition of family bond over a girl. The film attracted negative reception from critics while Nadheem wrote: "Embraced with futile characters, impractical scenes and out-dated music, the film has problems in each department. Little to no praise shall be regarded to Faisal who played a useless character with no impression".

In 2015, Faisal stepped into the seat of direction by co-directing Fathimath Nahula's 13 episodes television drama series, Umurah Salaan (2015) which centers on a squabble family which is separated due to the greed for money and misunderstandings. The series which stars Mariyam Azza, Aminath Rishfa and Ahmed Azmeel in lead roles, Faisal portrays the character Ashraf, a forthright businessman who marries an orphan. Also, he starred in Nahula and Aishath Rishmy's television drama series, Vakivumuge Kurin where he played the caring husband who struggles to deal with his seductive colleague.

2016 was a successful year for Faisal where he starred in the three highest grossing Maldivian films of the year. His first release of was the Ali Shifau-directed romantic comedy Vaashey Mashaa Ekee (2016) opposite Mohamed Jumayyil and Mariyam Majudha. His performance as a brainwashing friend was widely appreciated in the reviews; Ahmed Nadheem from Avas picked Faisal as his most favorite performer in the film. "I personally believe that Faisal is an actor who overacts in all of his previous films, but this comes as a pleasing improvement". He then played the role of Nihad, member of the friends who get trapped in a haunted house, in Fathimath Nahula's horror film 4426 (2016). Upon release, the film received mostly positive reviews from critics and was declared as the highest grossing Maldivian film of the year. Ahmed Nadheem of Avas labelled the film as a "masterpiece" and noted his performance to be "good". Shafeeu-directed Baiveriyaa (2016), a comedy film featuring an ensemble cast was his second release of the year. The film revolves around an aspiring actress who flees from her family to pursue a career in the industry and the suspicions and confusions that follows. Upon release the film was positively received by critics. Nazim Hassan of Avas applauded the comical timing of the characters and wrote: "The film explores a different side of Faisal where he proves his versatility by delivering a notable performance in the comedy scenes, not to mention the dance sequences; another surprise from him". The following year he starred in a romantic comedy film Mee Loaybakee which was directed by Ali Shifau. The film emerged as one of the highest grossing Maldivian films of 2017.

2018 was a dull year for Maldivian film-industry with regards to 2018 Maldivian presidential election, hence only one film of Faisal was released during the year; a suspense thriller film Dhevansoora (2018) written and directed by Yoosuf Shafeeu. The film marks Shafeeu's thirtieth direction and features an ensemble cast of twenty-one actors. Revolving around a murder investigating, he played a police officer and the investigation head trying to solve the murder mystery. The film received positive reviews from critics and was considered a "norm-breaker" for the Maldivian cinema. Ahmed Hameed Adam reviewing from VNews applauded Faisal's versatility since he was believed to be "stereotyped" as a comedian. "No argument shall settle to dispute the fact that this is the best performance of Faisal. He has extracted his best through this character". Ismail Nail Rasheed from Raajje.mv wrote: "Though remembered for his comic roles, Faisal is surprisingly great in the serious role specially during the moments of sudden realization". His next release of the year was another collaboration with Fathimath Nahula, the first Maldivian web-series, Huvaa. The series consisting of sixty episodes and streamed through the digital platform Baiskoafu, centers around a happy and radiant family which breaks into despairing pieces after a tragic incident that led to an unaccountable loss. The series and his performance as an introvert and dedicated son searching for his birth mother were positively received.

The following year, he starred in Yoosuf Shafeeu's horror comedy film 40+ (2019), a sequel to 2017 released comedy film Naughty 40, which was well received both critically and commercially. This was followed by another direction from Shafeeu, a romantic horror film which follows a happily married couple who goes on a honeymoon trip and the paranormal activities they experience due to black-magic. Mariyam Waheedha from Miadhu considers his portrayal of the character Majdhee to be "different from his previous works".

Filmography

Feature film

Television

Short film

Other work

Accolades

References

External links
 

Maldivian male film actors
Living people
Maldivian film directors
1980 births